Screening may refer to:
 Screening cultures, a type a medical test that is done to find an infection
 Screening (economics), a strategy of combating adverse selection (includes sorting resumes to select employees)
 Screening (environmental), a set of analytical techniques used to monitor levels of potentially hazardous organic compounds in the environment
 Screening (medicine), a strategy used in a population to identify an unrecognised disease in individuals without signs or symptoms
 Screening (printing), a process that represents lighter shades as tiny dots, rather than solid areas, of ink by passing ink through
 Screening (process stage), process stage when cleaning paper pulp
 Screening (tactical), one military unit providing cover for another in terms of both physical presence and firepower
 Baggage screening, a security measure
 Call screening, the process of evaluating the characteristics of a telephone call before deciding how or whether to answer it
 Electric-field screening, the damping of electric fields caused by the presence of mobile charge carriers
 Electrostatic screening, a decrease in shielding effort between the nucleus and last orbital due to electrons present between them
 Film screening, the displaying of a motion picture or film
 High-throughput screening, a method for scientific experimentation especially used in drug discovery
 Mechanical screening, the practice of taking granulated ore material and separating it into multiple grades by particle size
 Smoke screening, blanketing an area with smoke to provide cover

As a proper name
 Screening (1997 film), a 1997 short film directed by Gil Cates Jr.
 Screening (2006 film), a 2006 short film directed by Anthony Green

See also
 Screen (disambiguation)
 Screener (disambiguation)